Foza is a town in the province of Vicenza, Veneto, north-eastern Italy. It is west of SS47 state road.

Twin towns
 Neufahrn in Niederbayern, Germany
 Sinnai, Italy

Sources

(Google Maps)

Cities and towns in Veneto